John Camm (1718–1778) was an Anglican priest who served as the seventh (and last Tory) president of the College of William and Mary. He was a fierce Tory advocate of the prerogative of the Crown and the established Church.

Education
Born in 1718, in Hornsea, Yorkshire, and educated in the school at nearby Beverley, John Camm was admitted to Trinity College, Cambridge, on June 16, 1738, and took his B.A. in early 1742.

Career
He became the minister of Newport Parish, Isle of Wight County, Virginia, in 1745. From 1749 to 1771, he served on the faculty of the College of William and Mary as professor of divinity and was the minister of York-Hampton Parish, York County.  He served as the College of William and Mary's President from 1772 to 1777, being succeeded by James Madison.

Life
As a leader of the Church-and-College party in Virginia, Camm defied the authority of his local vestry, the Board of Visitors of the College of William & Mary, and the colonial legislature in the Two-Penny Acts controversies and the American episcopate debates. He wrote three lengthy pamphlets, a number of addresses to the King, several dozen essays to the gazettes, and some scattered poetry.

Camm's peers elected him to positions of responsibility throughout his career in Virginia. Governor Francis Fauquier, who disliked Camm and alluded in a letter to the Bishop of London to Camm's delight "to raise a Flame and live in it," admitted that Camm had ability. He was a leader in organizing clerical opposition to the Virginia legislature's Two-Penny Acts of 1755 and 1758: most of the significant arguments about Crown prerogatives and colonial autonomy expressed during the Stamp Act crisis and the Revolutionary War were formed during these earlier Two-Penny Acts controversies. Camm was elected to carry the clergy's case to the Privy Council in England in 1758, where he successfully petitioned the King to disallow the Virginia acts.

On returning to Virginia, Camm was drawn into a pamphlet war with two members of the Virginia legislature, Landon Carter and Richard Bland. He defied the Board of Visitors of the college in their attempts to curb the authority of the president and faculty, was dismissed from his faculty position in 1757, appealed to England, and was reinstated in 1763.

During the summer and fall of 1771, Camm became president of the College of William & Mary, rector of Bruton Parish Church in Williamsburg, commissary of the Bishop of London in Virginia, and a member of the Royal Council of Virginia. His small vocal group of Anglican clergy continued resistance to secular authority. A literary battle to which Camm lent his pen was waged in the Virginia Gazette in 1771–1774, and this dispute on the episcopate was lost, from the point of view of the established church in America.

Camm's outspoken Tory views did not require him to preach with pistols on his pulpit, as did his friend Jonathan Boucher. He died quietly in late 1778.

Legacy
During his career Camm wrote three lengthy pamphlets, a number of addresses to the King, several dozen essays to the gazettes, and some scattered poetry. He was an indefatigable letter writer, and his correspondence reflects the major debates of more than thirty years in Virginia. His contribution to American Revolutionary debates was to state cogently the minority viewpoint of Virginia Loyalists.

Camm Hall at the college's campus adjacent to Colonial Williamsburg is named in his honor.

References

External links
John Camm material, Special Collections Research Center, Earl Gregg Swem Library, College of William and Mary.
John Camm at Encyclopedia Virginia

Presidents of the College of William & Mary
1718 births
1778 deaths
People from Hornsea
English emigrants
Alumni of Trinity College, Cambridge
Virginia colonial people
Loyalists in the American Revolution from Virginia
18th-century Anglican theologians